The 25th Golden Bell Awards was held on 14 April 1990 at the Sun Yat-sen Memorial Hall in Taipei, Taiwan. The ceremony was broadcast by Taiwan Television (TTV).

Winners

References

1990
1990 in Taiwan